

See also

 Paleontology in Georgia (U.S. state)

References

 

Georgia
Stratigraphic units
Stratigraphy of Georgia (U.S. state)
Georgia (U.S. state) geography-related lists
United States geology-related lists